Antonio Esteve Ródenas or Antonio Gades (14 November 1936 – 20 July 2004) was a Spanish flamenco dancer and choreographer. He helped to popularise the art form on the international stage. He was born in Elda, Alicante, and was the father of actress María Esteve and singer Celia Flores, his daughters with his ex-partner Marisol, herself a popular actress and singer.

Career

Flamenco

Gades's most notable works included dance adaptations of Prosper Mérimée's Carmen and Federico García Lorca's Blood Wedding (Bodas de Sangre), as well as a feature-length adaptation of Manuel de Falla's 23-minute ballet El amor brujo.

In the 1990s, he toured the world with his show Fuenteovejuna, based on Lope de Vega's play of the same name.

Film

Gades collaborated with the Spanish director Carlos Saura in the filming of the adaptations of Carmen and Blood Wedding, which also featured Cristina Hoyos.

Ballet

Gades co-founded and became the artistic director of the Spanish National Ballet (Ballet Nacional de España) in 1978.

Personal life and death

Gades was prominent as a political activist in Alicante, where he proclaimed self-determination for the Catalan nation during the Spanish Transition between the late 1970s and early 1980s. He was a member of the Central Committee of the Communist Party of the Peoples of Spain, a Marxist–Leninist organization. In 1987 he was a member of the jury at the 15th Moscow International Film Festival.

He was married to the Spanish actress and singer Marisol for 4 years; they had three daughters.

He died in Madrid from cancer.

Awards

About six weeks before his death, Gades received the "Order of José Martí", one of the highest honors of Cuba, from Fidel Castro, in Havana, Cuba.

In 2004 his ashes were interred at the Mausoleum of the Frank País Second Eastern Front, a memorial cemetery in Santiago de Cuba.

Filmography

Los Tarantos 1963
The Pleasure Seekers 1964
With the East Wind 1966
El amor brujo 1967
The Last Meeting 1967
Bodas de sangre 1981
Carmen 1983
El amor brujo 1986
Fuenteovejuna 2012

See also
 List of dancers

References

External links
 Ermanna Carmen Mandelli, Antonio Gades. Palermo, L'Epos, 2004. 
 Cuban Government's webpage on Gades
 Antonio Gades biography and films or products in which he has taken part
 

1936 births
2004 deaths
People from Elda
Flamenco dancers
Spanish male dancers
Deaths from cancer in Spain